The Music Master is a 1908 American short silent drama film directed by Wallace McCutcheon, Sr. starring D. W. Griffith. It is considered to be a lost film.

Plot
The Music Master tells the story of violinist Herr Von Mitzel (D. W. Griffith) who falls in love with his student, the daughter of an English lord. However, due to the difference in their social status he is unable to marry her.

References

1908 lost films
Lost American films
American silent short films
1908 films
1908 short films
1908 drama films
1900s American films